Nikos Nicolaou (born 28 June 1978 in Cyprus), is a Cypriot football defender who last played for Nea Salamis Famagusta. He should not be confused with his namesake that played for Anorthosis Famagusta.

External links
 
 Profile at Playmaker Stats

1978 births
Olympiakos Nicosia players
Nea Salamis Famagusta FC players
Cypriot footballers
Association football defenders
Living people

it:Nikolas Nicolaou